Shanghai Triad is a 1995 Chinese crime-drama film, directed by Zhang Yimou and starring Gong Li. The script is written by Bi Feiyu based on Li Xiao's 1994 novel Rules of a Clan (门规). The film is set in the criminal underworld of 1930s Shanghai, Republic of China and spans seven days. Shanghai Triad's Chinese title reads "Row, row, row to Grandma Bridge", refers to a well known traditional Chinese lullaby.

The film was the last collaboration between Zhang Yimou and actress Gong Li in the 1990s, thus ending a successful partnership that had begun with Zhang's debut, Red Sorghum, and had evolved into a romantic relationship as well. With the wrapping of filming for Shanghai Triad the two agreed to end their relationship both professionally and personally.  Gong Li and Zhang Yimou would not work together again until 2006's Curse of the Golden Flower.

Plot

Tang Shuisheng (Wang Xiaoxiao) has arrived in Shanghai to work  for a Triad Boss (played by Li Baotian), also named Tang. He is taken to a warehouse where two rival groups of Triads carry out an opium deal that goes wrong, leaving one of the rival members dead. Shuisheng is then taken by his uncle to Tang's palatial home, where he is assigned to serve Xiao Jinbao (Gong Li), a cabaret singer and mistress of the Boss. It is soon learned that Jinbao is also carrying on an affair with the Boss's number two man, Song (Sun Chun).

On the third night, Shuisheng witnesses a bloody gang fight between the Boss and a rival, Fat Yu, in which his uncle is killed. The Boss and a small entourage retreat to an island. There, Jinbao befriends Cuihua (Jiang Baoying), a peasant woman with a young daughter, Ajiao. When Jinbao unwittingly meddles in Cuihua's business, it results in the Boss's men killing Cuihua's lover. Furious, Jinbao confronts the Boss and tells Shuisheng to leave Shanghai.

By the seventh day, Song arrives to the island along with Zheng (Fu Biao), the Boss's number three man. Shuisheng has multiple cases of explosive, sudden diarrhea, and while evacuating his bowels in the reeds, overhears hiding men plotting to kill Jinbao. He rushes back and tells Boss what he heard. During a mahjong game, the Boss calmly confronts Song with evidence of his treachery. The gang kills Song's men and buries Song alive. The Boss then informs Jinbao that she will have to die as well for her role in Song's betrayal, along with Cuihua. As Shuisheng attempts to save her from her fate, he is thrown back and beaten. The film ends with Shuisheng tied to the sails of the ship as it sails back to Shanghai. The Boss takes Cuihua's young daughter with him, telling her that in a few years, she will become just like Jinbao.

Cast 
 Wang Xiaoxiao as Tang Shuisheng, the young teenage boy who serves as the film's protagonist and he falls under the spell of the boss's mistress, Jinbao.
 Gong Li as Xiao Jinbao, a Shanghai nightclub singer, Jinbao is the mistress of the Triad Boss. 
 Li Xuejian as Uncle Liu, a servant to a Triad organization and Tang Shuisheng's uncle. 
 Li Baotian as Tang the Triad Boss who hides a ruthless side.
 Sun Chun as Song, the Boss's number two man, Song's affair with Jinbao sets up the film's main conflict.
 Fu Biao as Zheng, the Boss's number three man.
 Yang Qianguan as Ajiao, a young girl living on the secluded island with her mother.
 Jiang Baoying as Cuihao, Ajiao's mother, a peasant woman who prepares meals for the Boss while he is hiding on his island estate.

Production 

Shanghai Triad was director Zhang Yimou's seventh feature film. Zhang's previous film, To Live had landed the director in trouble with Chinese authorities, and he was temporarily banned from making any films funded from overseas sources. Shanghai Triad was therefore only allowed to continue production after it was officially categorized as local production. The director has since noted that his selection of Shanghai Triad to follow up the politically controversial To Live was no accident, as he hoped that a "gangster movie" would be a conventional film.

The film was originally intended to be a straight adaptation of the novel Gang Law by author Li Xiao. This plan eventually changed with Gong Li's character becoming more important and the story's viewpoint shifting to that of the young boy, Tang Shuisheng. As a result, the film's title was changed to reflect its new "younger" perspective.

Reception
Though perhaps less well known than some of Zhang Yimou's more celebrated films (notably Ju Dou, To Live and Raise the Red Lantern), Shanghai Triad was nevertheless generally praised by critics upon its release, with a 90% "fresh" rating on the review-database, Rotten Tomatoes from 29 reviews. With its headline position in the New York Film Festival, The New York Times''' critic Janet Maslin opened her review that despite the clichéd genre of the "gangster film," Shanghai Triad nevertheless "movingly affirms the magnitude of [Zhang Yimou's] storytelling power." Derek Elley of the entertainment magazine Variety similarly found the film to be an achievement, particularly in how it played with genre conventions, calling the film a "stylized but gripping portrait of mob power play and lifestyles in 1930 Shanghai." Roger Ebert, however, provided a counterpoint to the film's praise, arguing that the choice of the boy as the film's main protagonist ultimately hurt the film, and that Shanghai Triad was probably "the last, and ... certainly the least, of the collaborations between the Chinese director Zhang Yimou and the gifted actress Gong Li" (though Gong would again work with Zhang in 2006's Curse of the Golden Flower). Even Ebert however, conceded that the film's technical credits were well done, calling Zhang one of the "best visual stylists of current cinema."

Awards and nominations
 Cannes Film Festival (1995)
Technical Grand Prize
 Camerimage Awards (1995)
Golden Frog — Lü Yue (nominated)
 Los Angeles Film Critics Association Awards (1995) 
 LAFCA Award, Best Cinematography — Lü Yue 
 New York Film Critics Circle Awards (1995)
 NYFCC Award, Best Cinematography — Lü Yue 
 National Board of Review (1995)
 NBR Award, Best Foreign Language Film 
 53rd Golden Globe Awards (1996)
 Golden Globe, Best Foreign Language Film (nominated)
 68th Academy Awards (1996)
 Best Cinematography — Lü Yue (nominated)

 Retail release Shanghai Triad'' was released on December 12, 2000 in the United States on region 1 DVD by Sony Pictures' Columbia TriStar label. The DVD edition includes English and Spanish subtitles. The DVD is in the widescreen letterbox format with an aspect ratio of 1.85:1. Blu-ray with 108 minute runtime was released on Aug 4, 2020.

See also 

 Triads — Chinese underground societies that play a major part of the film

References

External links 
 
 
 
 
 Shanghai Triad homepage at Sony Pictures Classics

1995 films
Films set in Shanghai
Films set in the 1930s
1995 crime drama films
Triad films
1990s Mandarin-language films
Films based on Chinese novels
Films directed by Zhang Yimou
Chinese crime drama films
1990s Hong Kong films